The Karate Kid is a 1989 American animated children's television series which debuted on NBC's Saturday morning lineup. It starred Joey Dedio, Robert Ito, and Janice Kawaye. It is based on the Karate Kid series of films, and was produced by DIC Enterprises, Saban Entertainment and Columbia Pictures Television.

The show was originally planned for daily syndication for fall 1988 with 65 episodes, before eventually settling on a 13-episode order for NBC Saturday mornings in 1989.

Overview
The show retains apprentice Daniel LaRusso (voiced by Joey Dedio) and his mentor Mr. Miyagi (voiced by Robert Ito) but abandons the karate tournament motif for an adventure/quest setting. A miniature shrine with magic powers is taken from its resting place on Okinawa, and it is up to Miyagi and Daniel to recover it. Together with Okinawan girl Taki Tamurai (voiced by Janice Kawaye), the karatekas search the globe and, naturally, encounter several opportunities to fight their way out of trouble.

Pat Morita reprised his role as Mr. Miyagi before the opening through a narration in which he explains the episode's plot from his character's point of view. Morita provided opening narration for every episode aside from episode 8.

Episode formula
The episodes typically follow a similar formula: Mr. Miyagi obtains a lead on the shrine's location in some exotic corner of the world. Daniel and Taki follow up on it, and in the process encounter some villains who have either obtained or are seeking to obtain the shrine for their own evil purposes. After engaging and defeating the villains, Daniel comes within a hair's breadth of retrieving the shrine, only to have it escape from his grasp by random chance (for example, drifting away after being tied to a bunch of balloons, or being swept into the ocean), thus ensuring that the search continues into the next episode.

Syndication
The show was available for purchase on iTunes, and could be streamed for free in the US on Netflix, Internet Movie Database, Hulu, and The Minisode Network and Crackle. As of May 2018, the show was no longer available on iTunes, Netflix, or Hulu.

In Canada, the series can be streamed online via CTV's free, ad-supported video on demand hub "CTV Throwback".

Episodes

Cast
 Joey Dedio as Daniel LaRusso
 Robert Ito as Mr. Miyagi
 Janice Kawaye as Taki Tamurai

Additional voices

Charlie Adler
James Avery
Bever-Leigh Banfield
Michael Bell
Bettina Bush
Darleen Carr
François Chau
Cam Clarke
Townsend Coleman
Danny Cooksey
Brian Cummings
Jim Cummings
E.G. Daily (uncredited)
Debi Derryberry
Shawn Donahue
Fernando Escandon
Ron Feinberg
Takayo Fischer
Linda Gary
Ellen Gerstell
Ed Gilbert
Salim Grant
Edan Gross
Ernest Harada
Billie Hayes
Dana Hill
Michael Horton
Jerry Houser
Buster Jones
Dana Lee
Katie Leigh
Kadar Lewis
Sherry Lynn
Mary McDonald-Lewis
Joey Miyashima
Claudette Nevins
Toy Newkirk
Dyana Ortelli
Rob Paulsen
Diane Pershing
Brock Peters
Hal Rayle
Peter Renaday
Robert Ridgely
Davis Roberts
Josh Rodine
Neil Ross
Kath Soucie
John Stephenson
Cree Summer
Brian Tochi
Tamlyn Tomita
Marcelo Tubert
Chick Vennera
B.J. Ward
Anthony Watson
R.J. Williams
Anderson Wong
Keone Young

Crew
 Ginny McSwain – Voice Director

Cobra Kai series
With regard to the series Cobra Kai, Jon Hurwitz clarified that the Karate Kid series is not canon, but an Easter Egg from it appears in Season 3, in response to the question about Karate Kid animated series official status within the Karate Kid / Cobra Kai universe. The Easter Egg is in the form of the Miyagi-Do shrine, briefly seen at Chozen Toguchi's dojo in Okinawa halfway through the season.

References

External links

 
 

1989 American television series debuts
1989 American television series endings
The Karate Kid (franchise) mass media
Martial arts television series
Animated television shows based on films
NBC original programming
Television series by DIC Entertainment
Television series by Sony Pictures Television
1980s American animated television series
English-language television shows
Television series by Saban Entertainment
American children's animated action television series
American children's animated adventure television series